WBEY-FM (97.9 FM) is a radio station broadcasting a country music format. Licensed to Crisfield, Maryland, United States, the station is owned by GSB Media, LLC, and features programming from ABC Radio, Westwood One, Maryland News Network, and United Stations Radio Network.

History
WBEY originally signed on in 1993, on 96.9 FM in Crisfield, Maryland. In the early 2000s, WBEY relocated its studios from Crisfield to Pocomoke City, Maryland.
 
In October 2018, WBEY-FM was purchased from Bay Broadcasting Inc. (Michael Powell) by A. Wray Fitch and Greg Bojko under the joint company GSB Media, LLC for $237,500, making WBEY the sixth station and third format operated by GSB Media, LLC. With the sale, WBEY-FM relocated from the studios and transmitter site of WGOP in Pocomoke City. It joined sister stations WCTG and WVES programmed as adult hits/variety (96.5 & 101.5 CTG WCTG), and WOWZ-FM/WOWZ-LP and WICO-FM programmed as Classic Country (WOW 101.1 & 99.3 That's Country WICO-FM).

Affiliations
National and global news are provided by Westwood One.
 
Local News and weather is provided by Maryland News Network owned by Steve Clendenin.

External links
Bay Country 97.9’s website

Crisfield, Maryland
BEY-FM
Radio stations established in 1975
1975 establishments in Maryland